Ji Zheng may refer to:
 (died 729 BC), name Ji Zheng, king of Yan during the Spring and Autumn period of China
King Xiang of Zhou (died 619 BC), name Ji Zheng, king of the Chinese Zhou dynasty
Chi Cheng (athlete) (born 1944), or Ji Zheng, Taiwanese track and field athlete

See also
Chi Cheng (disambiguation)
Zheng Ji (disambiguation)